The Library of American Broadcasting (LAB) – a Washington, D.C. institution since 1972 – began life as the Broadcast Pioneers Library in space donated by the National Association of Broadcasters. The collection was thought up by William S. Hedges, a retired NBC executive, who created the Broadcasting Pioneers History Project in 1964 and began collecting historical materials. The Library expanded rapidly for twenty years, but as space and funding became increasingly scarce, the Library's governing board decided to seek another setting for the collection. They chose the University of Maryland, and in October 1994, LAB moved to its new location.

Now housed in the Broadcasting Archives at the University of Maryland, the Library of American Broadcasting is a wide-ranging collection of audio/video recordings, books, pamphlets, periodicals, personal collections, photographs, scripts, and vertical files devoted exclusively to the history of broadcasting. LAB holds many collections of note, including the papers of Sol Taishoff, founder of the influential industry publication Broadcasting; the papers of Helen J. Sioussat, director of the Talks Department at CBS (1937–58); the scrapbooks of Edward J. Kirby, chief of the radio branch of the War Department in World War II; and the papers of Edythe Meserand, radio executive and first President of the American Women in Radio and Television, among others.

The Library of American Broadcasting received onscreen credit for research materials provided to the producers of the film Good Night and Good Luck (2005). The holdings of the LAB yielded photographs of Murrow, as well as a number of shots of the CBS studios and offices of that era. These were instrumental in creating the period detail of the film, which received a total of six Academy Award nominations, one of which was for Art Direction.

References

Further reading
 The Broadcast Pioneers Library. Updated ed. of ... [the] tenth anniversary brochure. Washington, D.C.: Broadcast Pioneers Library, 1985.

External links

 
 
 Library of American Broadcasting Foundation
 Library of American Broadcasting Scripts collection, Special Collections, University of Maryland Libraries
 William S. Hedges papers, Special Collections, University of Maryland Libraries. Hedges assembled one of the core collections at the Library of American Broadcasting.

Libraries in Maryland
Television archives in the United States
History of broadcasting
University of Maryland, College Park
1972 establishments in Washington, D.C.
1994 disestablishments in Washington, D.C.
1994 establishments in Maryland